Grossart is a surname. Notable people with the surname include:

Sir Angus Grossart (1937–2022), Scottish businessman
William Grossart (1896–?), Scottish World War I flying ace

See also
Grosart